Shirley McCay  (born 7 June 1988) is an Ireland women's field hockey international. She was a member of the Ireland team that played in the 2018 Women's Hockey World Cup final. McCay has played in the Women's Irish Hockey League for Old Alex, Ulster Elks and Pegasus. She was a member of the  Ulster Elks team that won two successive Irish Senior Cup titles in 2014–15 and 2015–16. Since 2015 she has been Ireland's most capped women's field hockey international.

According to some sources she is also "Ireland's most capped sportswoman in any code"  and the holder of "the most international caps by any Irish athlete (male or female) across any sport".

Early years, family and education
McCay's hometown is Drumquin, County Tyrone. She is the daughter of Robert and Hazel McCay. She has a sister, Lindsay. She was educated at Omagh Academy and Dublin Institute of Technology.

Domestic teams

Omagh Academy
While attending Omagh Academy, McCay was encouraged to play field hockey by her PE teacher, Mary Swann. She was captain of the academy under-14 team which won the Ulster Junior Schoolgirls' Cup. In 2005 she was a member of the Omagh Academy team that won the Ulster Senior Schoolgirls' Cup and the Kate Russell All-Ireland Schoolgirls Championships. In addition to playing for Omagh Academy, McCay also played senior club field hockey with Omagh and Randalstown.

Ulster Elks
McCay first played for the Ulster Elks during the 2008–09
season. She re-joined the Elks for the 2014–15 season, teaming up with among others, Megan Frazer and Stephanie Jameson. She subsequently helped the Elks win the Irish Senior Cup in both 2014–15 
and 2015–16. After the Elks were relegated from the Women's Irish Hockey League at the end of the 2016–17 season, McCay switched to Pegasus.

KHC Dragons
During the 2009–10 season McCay played for KHC Dragons.

Old Alex
Between 2010 and 2014 McCay played for Old Alex in the Women's Irish Hockey League. While playing for Old Alex, McCay also studied journalism at Dublin Institute of Technology.

Pegasus
Since 2017–18 McCay has played for Pegasus in the Women's Irish Hockey League.

Ireland international
McCay represented Ireland at Under-16 and Under-18 levels before making her senior debut. She made her senior debut in January 2007 against Canada. In April 2011 she captained Ireland as she made her 100th senior appearance against France. In March 2015 McCay was a member of the Ireland team that won a 2014–15 Women's FIH Hockey World League Round 2 tournament hosted in Dublin, defeating Canada in the final after a penalty shoot-out. On 11 June 2015 McCay made her 200th senior Ireland appearance at the 2014–15 Women's FIH Hockey World League Semifinals in a game against Germany. In July 2015 she was also a member of the Ireland team that won the 2015 Women's EuroHockey Championship II. In the final against the Czech Republic, McCay made her 209th senior Ireland appearance. As a result, she became  Ireland's most capped women's field hockey international, moving one ahead of Nikki Symmons. In January 2017 she was also a member of the Ireland team that won a 2016–17 Women's FIH Hockey World League Round 2 tournament in Kuala Lumpur, defeating Malaysia 3–0 in the final. In August 2017 she made her 250th appearance at the 2017 Women's EuroHockey Nations Championship.

McCay represented Ireland at the 2018 Women's Hockey World Cup and was a prominent member of the team that won the silver medal. She featured in all of Ireland's games throughout the tournament, including the pool games against the United States, India, and England, the quarter-final against India, the semi-final against Spain and the final against the Netherlands. During the tournament McCay scored against United States  and was named player of the match in the pool game against India. Before the World Cup, McCay announced she would probably retire after the tournament. However following Ireland's success, she said she would reconsider. She announced her retirement from international play on 9 September 2021.

McCay was appointed Member of the Order of the British Empire (MBE) in the 2022 Birthday Honours for services to hockey and to the community in Northern Ireland.

Field hockey coach
Since 2013 McCay has worked as a coach for the Ulster Hockey Union.

Honours
Ireland
Women's Hockey World Cup
Runners Up: 2018
Women's FIH Hockey World League
Winners: 2015 Dublin, 2017 Kuala Lumpur
Women's EuroHockey Championship II
Winners: 2015
Women's Hockey Champions Challenge I
Runners Up: 2014
Women's FIH Hockey Series
Runners Up: 2019 Banbridge
Women's Four Nations Cup
Runners Up: 2017
Women's Field Hockey Olympic Qualifier
Runners Up: 2012
Ulster Elks
Irish Senior Cup
Winners: 2014–15, 2015–16
Omagh Academy
Kate Russell All-Ireland Schoolgirls Championships
Winners: 2005
Ulster Senior Schoolgirls' Cup
Winners: 2004–05 
Ulster Junior Schoolgirls' Cup
Winners: ?

References

External links
 
 Shirley McCay at Hockey Ireland

1988 births
Living people
Ireland international women's field hockey players
Female field hockey players from Northern Ireland
Irish female field hockey players
British female field hockey players
Women's Irish Hockey League players
KHC Dragons players
Expatriate field hockey players
Female field hockey midfielders
Female field hockey defenders
Irish field hockey coaches
People educated at Omagh Academy
Alumni of Dublin Institute of Technology
Sportspeople from County Tyrone
Irish expatriate sportspeople in Belgium
Field hockey players at the 2020 Summer Olympics
Olympic field hockey players of Ireland
Members of the Order of the British Empire